Östra Sönnarslöv is a locality situated in Kristianstad Municipality, Skåne County, Sweden with 294 inhabitants in 2010.

Östra Sönnarslöv Church is a partially preserved medieval church with murals from the 15th century. It also contains the burial chapel of the Ramel family.

References 

Populated places in Kristianstad Municipality
Populated places in Skåne County